Tous may refer to:
 Tous (company), a Spanish jewelry designer
 Tous, Iran
 Tous, Valencia, a municipality of the province of Valencia, Valencia Community, Spain
 Tous son of Nowzar
 Trotskyist Organization of the United States (TOUS), an American Trotskyite group
 Paco Tous (born 1964), Spanish actor